The Royal Armouries Museum in Leeds, West Yorkshire, England, is a national museum which displays the National Collection of Arms and Armour. It is part of the Royal Armouries family of museums, with other sites at the Royal Armouries' traditional home in the Tower of London, and the National Collection of Artillery at Fort Nelson, Hampshire. The Frazier History Museum in Louisville, Kentucky, USA also previously housed a collection of artifacts on loan from the Royal Armouries. The Royal Armouries is a non-departmental public body sponsored by the Department for Culture, Media and Sport.

The Royal Armouries Museum is a £42.5 million purpose-built museum  located in Leeds Dock that opened in 1996. Its collection was previously on display or in storage at the Tower of London where the Royal Armouries still maintains a presence and displays in the White Tower.

As at all UK National Museums, entry is free, though certain extra attractions are charged for.

Construction 
The museum was one of the first projects carried out under the UK private finance initiative: a non-departmental public body, the Royal Armouries, contracted with a private sector company, Royal Armouries International (RAI), which was financed by a long-term bank loan together with equity investment from 3i, Gardner Merchant, Electra and Yorkshire Electricity. RAI commissioned a new building to accommodate the museum: it was designed by Derek Walker and Buro Happold, and built by Alfred McAlpine at a cost of £42.5 million. and was officially opened by Queen Elizabeth II in March 1996.

Location 
Situated close to the city centre on the bank of the River Aire the museum is among many buildings built in the same era that saw a rejuvenation of the Leeds waterfront. It is located on Armouries Square, in Leeds Dock. Road access is by Armouries Drive and Chadwick Street.

Features

Main building 
The Royal Armouries Museum itself was designed from the inside out. The ceiling heights of the new building were designed to accommodate the longest staff weapons in the collections, displayed vertically, and are 6.5 meters off the ground at their highest point.

In addition to the five original galleries which house 5,000 objects in the permanent displays and the more recent Peace Gallery, the museum also includes the Hall of Steel, a giant staircase whose walls are decorated with trophy displays composed of 2,500 objects reminiscent of the historical trophy displays erected by the Tower Armouries from the 17th century.

The main entrance to the museum is accessed from Armouries Square.

War 
With displays dedicated to:
Ancient and Medieval warfare
17th and 18th centuries 
19th and 20th centuries

Peace – farewell to arms? 
This gallery can be found within the War Gallery and looks at the potential for a future free of arms, looking at disarmament and concepts such as détente. This gallery is in partnership with the Peace Museum in nearby Bradford.

Hunting 
This gallery deals with the potentially contentious subject of hunting with displays dedicated to:
Hunting through the ages 
Hunting as sport

Oriental 
A gallery with displays dedicated to:
South and South-east Asia 
China and Japan 
Central Asia, Islam and India

Tournament 
A large gallery on two floors showing a variety of arms and armour from the days of jousting.

Self defence 
This gallery has a number of different displays dedicated to:
Arms and armour as art 
The armed civilian
IMPACT – A poignant and challenging exhibition documents through photographs, personal statements and video, the effects of gun crime on a community.

Arena 
Running alongside the River Aire for 150 metres, with seating on the land-ward side, is the Jousting Arena: though the museum no longer has its own horses, two important jousting contests each year are still held with competitors from all over the world. Easter is the height of the jousting calendar when the arena hosts a four-day international competition between up to four jousting teams.  The four teams compete from Good Friday to Easter Sunday against each other, with the tournament final on Easter Monday. Summer sees the jousting season close with the last tournament of the year, an individual joust with jousters from all over the world competing for The Queen's Golden Jubilee Trophy.

Exhibits

Funding cuts 

In March 2011, following a 15% reduction in the Royal Armouries's funding, seventeen members of staff "including all of the museum’s expert horse riders, professional actors and stable staff" lost their jobs.

In popular culture 

The museum is mentioned in the Kaiser Chiefs song "Team Mate", from the band's debut album, Employment.

The Nightmare Stacks, by Charles Stross, is mainly set in and around Leeds and the novel's title is an allusion to the museum's holdings.

The Gamespot YouTube series "Firearms Expert Reacts" is filmed on the museum grounds and features the Royal Armoury's Keeper of Firearms and Artillery, Jonathan Ferguson, analyzing the design and use of  firearms in popular video games.

References

External links 

 

Museums established in 1996
Military and war museums in England
Museums in Leeds
Museums sponsored by the Department for Digital, Culture, Media and Sport
History museums in West Yorkshire
Armour collections